The Hum Award for Best Actor in a Negative Role is one of the Hum Awards of Merit presented annually by the Pakistani Hum Television Network and Entertainment Channel (HTNEC). It is given in an honor of an actor or actress who has delivered an outstanding performance in a negative or villainous role while working within the Television industry. As of 2nd Hum Awards (for 2013) was held in 2014 with Noman Ejaz winning the award, who was honored for his role in Ullu Baraye Farokht Nahi.The award has commonly been referred to as the hum for Best Actor in a Negative Role. Currently, nominees are determined by single transferable vote, within the actors and jury branch of HTNEC; while winners are selected by viewers votings. Multiple nominations for an actor in same category but for different work is eligible. Also actresses and actors are jointly nominated in this category.

Since its inception in 2014 the award has been given to two actors, Uzma Gillani became the oldest nominee of this category. As of 2015 ceremony, Samiya Mumtaz is the most recent winner of this category for her role in Sadqay Tumhare.

Winners and nominees
In the list below, winners are listed first in the colored row, followed by the other nominees. Following the hum's practice, the dramas below are listed by year of their Pakistan qualifying run, which is usually (but not always) the drama's year of release. As of the first ceremony, four soap actors were nominated for the award. For the first ceremony, the eligibility period spanned full calendar years. For example, the 1st Hum Awards presented on April 28, 2013, to recognized soap actors of dramas that were released between January, 2012, and December, 2012, the period of eligibility is the full previous calendar year from January 1 to December 31. However, this rule was subjected to change when at third year ceremony two (Sadqay Tumhare and Digest Writer) of seven nominated drama serials were running on TV at the time when nominations were announced.

Date and the award ceremony shows that the 2010 is the period from 2010 to 2020, while the year above winners and nominees shows that the dramas year in which they were telecast, and the figure in bracket shows the ceremony number, for example; an award ceremony is held for the dramas of its previous year.

2010s

See also 
 Hum Awards
 Hum Awards pre-show
 List of Hum Awards Ceremonies

References

External links
Official websites
 Hum Awards official website
 Hum Television Network and Entertainment Channel (HTNEC)
 Hum's Channel at YouTube (run by the Hum Television Network and Entertainment Channel)
 Hum Awards at Facebook (run by the Hum Television Network and Entertainment Channel)]

Hum Awards
Best Actor in a Negative Role Hum Award winners
Hum Award winners
Hum TV
Hum Network Limited